Adventures of Aladdin (Aladdin and the Magic Lamp) is a 1978 adventure fantasy film produced and directed by Homi Wadia. This was the last film produced/directed by him. The film was a Basant Pictures productions and starred Sachin, Nazneen, Jayshree T., Paintal, Raza Murad and Sudhir.

Homi Wadia turned to the Arabian Nights again for the story of Aladdin, after his earlier success with Aladdin Aur Jadui Chirag (1952). This time the film was in colour. It follows Aladdin's adventure with the magic lamp and his confrontation with the evil magician. This time the role was played by Sachin.

Cast
 Sachin
 Nazneen
 Jayshree T.
 Raza Murad
 Paintal
 Sudhir
 Kanchan Mattu
 Prema Narayan.

Production and Music
The special effects according to the credit roll of the film are attributed to "Basant Studio Special Effects Department under the supervision of Homi Wadia". The music was composed by Chitragupta with lyrics by Kafil Azar and Naqsh Lyallpuri. The singers were Mohammed Rafi, Asha Bhosle, Manna Dey and Anuradha Paudwal .

Songlist

References

External links

1978 films
1970s Hindi-language films
Films directed by Homi Wadia
Indian fantasy adventure films
1970s fantasy adventure films
Films scored by Chitragupta
Films based on Aladdin